The orange-crowned warbler (Leiothlypis celata) is a small songbird of the New World warbler family.

Taxonomy
The orange-crowned warbler was formally described in 1822 by the American zoologist Thomas Say under the binomial name Sylvia celatus from a specimen collected on an expedition from Pittsburgh to the Rocky Mountains led by Stephen Harriman Long. The specific epithet celatus is Latin and means "secret" or "hidden". The type locality is Omaha, Nebraska. The orange-crowned warbler is now placed in the genus Leiothlypis that was introduced by the Dutch ornithologist George Sangster in 2008. The genus name is derived from the Ancient Greek λειος/leios meaning "plain" and θλυπις/thlupis, an unknown small bird mentioned by Aristotle.

Four subspecies are recognised:
 L. c. celata (Say, 1822) – breeds in central Alaska to south Canada, winters in Guatemala
 L. c. lutescens (Ridgway, 1872) – breeds in west Canada and west USA, winters in Guatemala
 L. c. orestera (Oberholser, 1905) – breeds in west central Canada and west central USA, winters in Mexico
 L. c. sordida (Townsend, CH, 1890) – resident in south California (southwest USA) and northwest Mexico

Description 

The orange-crowned warbler has olive-grey upperparts, yellowish underparts with faint streaking and a thin pointed bill. It has a faint line over each eye and a faint broken eye ring.  The orange patch on the crown is usually not visible. Females and immatures are duller in colour than males. Western birds are yellower than eastern birds. Orange-crowned warblers are distinguished by their lack of wing bars, streaking on the underparts, strong face marking or bright colouring, resembling a fall Tennessee warbler and a black-throated blue warbler, both of which are also members of the New World warbler family.

The song of is a trill, descending in pitch and volume. The call is a high chip.

Distribution and habitat
Their breeding habitat is open shrubby areas across Canada, Alaska and the western United States. These birds migrate in the winter to the southern United States and south to Central America. Although they are quite common in the western United States, they are uncommon in the east.

Behaviour and ecology

Breeding

The nest is a small open cup well-concealed on the ground under vegetation or low in shrubs. The female builds the nest; four to six eggs are laid in a nest on the ground or in a low bush. Both parents feed the young.

Food and feeding
They forage actively in low shrubs, flying from perch to perch, sometimes hovering. These birds eat insects, berries and nectar.

References

External links

 Orange-crowned warbler - Island Misfits at Smithsonian Migratory Bird Center
 Orange-crowned warbler species account - Cornell Lab of Ornithology
 Orange-crowned warbler - Vermivora celata - USGS Patuxent Bird Identification InfoCenter
 
 
 
 
 

Leiothlypis
Birds of North America
orange-crowned warbler
Taxa named by Thomas Say